Kannankarangudi  is a village in the  
Arimalamrevenue block of Pudukkottai district, Tamil Nadu, India.

Demographics 
As per the 2001 census, Kannankarangudi had a total population of  
793 with 418 males and 375 females. Out of the total  
population 493 people were literate.

References

Villages in Pudukkottai district